Elizabeth Evadna Brey (November 23, 1931 – March 21, 2015), née Elizabeth Evadna Mullen, was an American competition swimmer who represented the United States at the 1956 Summer Olympics in Melbourne, Australia.  Brey swam for the silver medal-winning U.S. team in the preliminary heats of the women's 4×100-meter freestyle relay.  She was not eligible to receive a medal under the 1956 Olympic swimming rules, however, because she did not swim in the relay final. In addition to her Olympic appearance, Brey also competed at the 1951 and 1955 Pan American Games and won two gold and two silver medals.

Following her Olympic experience, she became the swim coach at George Washington University.  Her husband Paul was a high school athletics director in Maryland.  Her son Mike Brey is the men's basketball coach at the University of Notre Dame, daughter Brenda was a swimmer at Louisiana State University and is a physical education teacher and son Shane Brey is the Founder and inventor of 360 Hoops.  Brey graduated from Purdue University in 1953, and served in the United States Army as an officer. 
 
Brey died March 21, 2015, of a heart attack; she was 83 years old.

See also
 List of Purdue University people

References

1931 births
2015 deaths
American female freestyle swimmers
Olympic swimmers of the United States
People from Carbon County, Pennsylvania
Swimmers at the 1955 Pan American Games
Swimmers at the 1956 Summer Olympics
Pan American Games gold medalists for the United States
Pan American Games medalists in swimming
People from Lake Mary, Florida
Medalists at the 1955 Pan American Games
21st-century American women